Shaikhpara is a town, with a college, not identified in 2011 census as a separate place, in the Raninagar II CD block in the Domkol subdivision of Murshidabad district in the state of West Bengal, India. It is possibly part of Babaltali village in the census records. Babaltali is a big village with a population of 20,177 in 2011.

Geography

Location

Area overview
While the Lalbag subdivision is spread across both the natural physiographic regions of the district, Rarh and Bagri, the Domkal subdivision occupies the north-eastern corner of Bagri. In the map alongside, the Ganges/ Padma River flows along the northern portion. The border with Bangladesh can be seen in the north and the east. Murshidabad district shares with Bangladesh a porous international border which is notoriously crime prone (partly shown in this map). The Ganges has a tendency to change course frequently, causing severe erosion, mostly along the southern bank. The city of Murshidabad, a centre of major tourist attraction, is located in this area. In 1717, when Murshid Quli Khan became Subahdar, he made Murshidabad the capital of Subah Bangla (then Bengal, Bihar and Odisha). The entire area is overwhelmingly rural with over 90% of the population living in the rural areas.

Note: The map alongside presents some of the notable locations in the subdivisions. All places marked in the map are linked in the larger full screen map.

Transport
Islampur-Shaikpara Road meets Shaikhpara Sagarpara Road at Shaikhpara.

Education
G.D.College, a self-financed general degree college, was established at Shaikhpara in 2007. Affiliated with the University of Kalyani it offers honours courses in Bengali, English, Sanskrit, Arabic, history, Islamic history, philosophy, political science, physics, chemistry, geography, economics, mathematics and environmental science.

Shaikhpara A.R.M. Polytechnic at Shaikhpara offers diploma courses in food processing technology, computer software technology and medical lab technology.

References

Villages in Murshidabad district